Bagh-e-Ghoushkhane minaret() is a historical minaret in Isfahan, Iran. This minaret dates back to the 14th century. In the olden days it was in the neighborhood of the old city gate. Because of its proximity to the Ali ebn-e Sahl mausoleum it is also known as Ali-ebn-e-Sahl minaret. Its newest famous name is Bagh-e-Ghoushkhane minaret, because of its proximity to the Ghushkhaneh garden. A part of its vertex and tiles have collapsed.

References 

Buildings and structures completed in the 14th century
Minarets in Iran
Buildings and structures in Isfahan